Hoda is a given name (alternate spellings include Houda and Huda). Notable people with that name include:

Female given name
 Hoda Abdel-Hamid, a war correspondent with Al Jazeera
 Hoda Ablan (born 1971), Yemeni poet
 Hoda Afshar Iranian-Australian photographer
 Hoda Ali, British human rights activist
 Hoda Barakat (born 1952), Lebanese writer
 Hoda ElMaraghy (born 1945), Canadian professor
 Hoda Elsadda, a Professor of English and Comparative Literature at Cairo University
 Hoda Kotb (born 1964), American journalist
 Hoda Lattaf (born 1978), French football player
 Hoda Mahmoudi, Iranian-American sociologist
 Hoda Muthana (born 1994), American Islamist
 Hoda Saad (born 1981), Moroccan singer-songwriter

Male given name
 Hoda Saber (1959–2011), an Iranian intellectual, economic scholar, journalist and social-political activist

See also

Houda (given name)
Huda (given name)

Persian feminine given names